The 2021 Nippon Professional Baseball (NPB) Draft was held on October 11, for the 57th time at the Grand Prince Hotel Takanawa to assign amateur baseball players to the NPB. It was arranged with the special cooperation of Taisho Pharmaceutical with official naming rights. The draft was officially called "The Professional Baseball Draft Meeting supported by Lipovitan D ". It has been sponsored by Taisho Pharmaceutical for the 9th consecutive year since 2013.

Summary 
Only the first round picks will be done by bid lottery. from 2019, the Professional Baseball Executive Committee has decided that the Central League and the Pacific League will be given the second round of waiver priority alternately every other year, and in 2021 Central League received the waiver priority. And since it was held in the middle of the regular season, the second round of Waiver priority was decided according to the ranking as of October 10, the day before. From the third round the order was reversed continuing in the same fashion until all picks were exhausted. It ends when all teams are "selected" or when the total number of selected players reaches 120. Also, if the number of players has not reached 120, we will continue to hold a "developmental squad player selection meeting" with the participation of the desired team.

First Round Contested Picks 

 Bolded teams indicate who won the right to negotiate contract following a lottery.
 In the first round, Kota Tatsu (Pitcher) was selected by the Fighters, Kenta Bright (Outfielder)  by the Dragons, Kyuta Kazama (Pitcher)  by the Hawks, Soshi Yoshino (Outfielder)  by the Eagles , Kou Matsukawa (Catcher)  by the Marines, and Ren Mukunoki (Pitcher) by the Buffaloes without a bid lottery.
 In the second round, Taisei Ota (Pitcher) was selected by the Giants, and Daichi Moriki (Pitcher) by the Tigers without a bid lottery.
 In the thrird  round, the last remaining the Carp, selected Takumi Kurohara (Pitcher)
 List of selected players.

Selected Players 

The order of the teams is the order of second round waiver priority.
 Bolded After that, a developmental player who contracted as a registered player under control.
 List of selected players.

Yokohama DeNA Baystars

Hokkaido Nippon-Ham Fighters

Chunichi Dragons

Saitama Seibu Lions

Hiroshima Toyo Carp

Fukuoka SoftBank Hawks

Yomiuri Giants

Tohoku Rakuten Golden Eagles

Hanshin Tigers

Chiba Lotte Marines

Tokyo Yakult Swallows

Orix Buffaloes

References

External links 
 2021年プロ野球ドラフト会議 supported by リポビタンD - NPB.jp Nippon Professional Baseball

Nippon Professional Baseball draft
Draft
Nippon Professional Baseball draft
Nippon Professional Baseball draft
Baseball in Japan
Sport in Tokyo
Events in Tokyo